Apon Manush is a 2017 Bangladeshi film Bappy Chowdhury, Amiya Ami and Pori Moni opposite him. Director Shah Alam Mondol directed the film. Its  musical score has been composed by Ahmed Imtiaz Bulbul. The film is a dubut of Amiya Ami in Dhallywood Film industry

Cast
Bappi Chowdhury
Pori Moni
Jannatul Ferdoush Peya
Amiya Ami

Music
"Shurjo Ki Hoy Kiron Chhara" - Imran Mahmudul and Nazmun Munira Nancy
"Tumi Amar Janamaz" - Monir Khan
"Prem Therapy" - Roma
"Dekhe Oi Figure" - Rupom and Roma
"Attar Attio" - Konok Chapa and Konal

Shooting
The film has been shot in various locations like Cox's Bazar, Rangpur and Dhaka.

References

External links
 

2017 films
Bengali-language Bangladeshi films
Films scored by Emon Saha
2010s Bengali-language films
Bangladeshi drama films
2017 drama films